Kaoaljani Union is a union of Basail Upazila, Tangail District, Bangladesh.

Demographics
According to the 2011 Bangladesh census, Kaoaljani Union had 5,406 households and a population of 21,554. The literacy rate (age 7 and over) was 49.9% (male: 53.9%, female: 46.6%).

See also
 Union Councils of Tangail District

References

Populated places in Tangail District
Unions of Basail Upazila